Bigot is a French surname. Notable people with the name include:

 Alexandre Bigot (1862–1927), French ceramicist
 Antoine Bigot (1825–1897), French writer, poet, and translator in Occitan
 Bernard Bigot (1950–2022), French physicist and chemist
 Christophe Bigot (born 1965), French diplomat
 Claude Bigot de Sainte-Croix (1744–1803), French Foreign Minister
 Eugène Bigot (1888–1965), French composer and conductor
 François Bigot (1703–1778), French government official
 François Bigot (royal notary) (1643–1708), notary royal of New France
 Fred Bigot, French musician better known as Electronicat
 Georges Ferdinand Bigot (1860–1927), French cartoonist, illustrator and artist
 Guillaume Bigot (1502– c. 1550), French writer, doctor, and poet
 Jacques Bigot (Jesuit) (1651–1711), French Jesuit priest and missionary in Canada
 Jacques Bigot (politician) (born 1952), French politician
 Jacques-Marie-Frangile Bigot (1818–1893), French naturalist and entomologist
 Joseph Bigot (1807–1894), French architect
 Jules Bigot (1915–2007), French footballer
 Marie Bigot (1786–1820), French musician and composer
 Marthe Bigot (1878–1962), French schoolteacher, feminist, pacifist, and communist
 Paul Bigot (1870–1942), French architect
 Quentin Bigot (born 1992), French athlete
 Sébastien-François Bigot (1706–1781), French soldier, sailor and naval tactician
 Trophime Bigot (1579–1650), French Baroque painter
 Vincent Bigot (1649–1720), French Jesuit priest and missionary in Canada

See also
 Félix-Julien-Jean Bigot de Préameneu (1747–1825), French jurist
 BIGOT list, a list of personnel possessing appropriate security clearance

French-language surnames